Aishwarya is a 2006 Indian Kannada-language romantic drama film directed by Indrajit Lankesh, starring Upendra, Daisy Bopanna with Deepika Padukone in her film debut. The film is an official remake of Manmadhudu (2002) with the flashback portion loosely inspired by Ghajini (2005). The film featured Upendra as a rich advertisement executive and changed his mass image into a classy one.

Plot
Abhishek Hegde (Upendra) had first fallen in love with a young lady Anjali (Daisy Bopanna) who was a model. 
As a struggling model, Anjali finds herself in a fortunate position where she is mistaken to be girlfriend to Abhishek and gets many new offers. Abhishek tries to confront her on seeing the news about his affair with her, but falls in love with her instead. Anjali dies in an accident when the two declare their love and are hugging, Abhishek's car hits a lorry. As Anjali's family were not in favour of her decision of marrying Abhishek, he is informed that Anjali has married the person she has been engaged to and did not care to tell him that Anjali has actually died and visit him, even when he was in hospital recovering from injuries after the accident. Abhishek's grandfather had faked an invitation card to Anjali's wedding only to keep him away from further mental trauma. This angers Abhishek and he starts to hate women with the generalisation that all women are like Anjali. After a long gap Aishwarya (Deepika Padukone) joins the company he works in which is owned by his uncle as an assistant manager. After a stay for a few days in the office, she gets Abhishek fired and she takes the position of manager. Abhishek now not knowing what to do talks to his aunt, but is interrupted by his uncle, who is mean to him. Finally, he takes the job of assistant manager as that is the only job available. Within a few days they assigned a task at Vienna. The two travel to Europe on business for ten days and learn from each other. Aishwarya transforms Abhishek by her assertive and fun-loving nature. They fall in love with each other but don't express it. Abhishek finds out that Aishwarya is getting engaged as decided by her family to a very strict family from Mandya. Aishwarya is aware of Abhishek's feelings for her. Both of them finally speak out their love. Now, Abhishek, to save his love, drives to reach Aishwarya. At that moment, Aishwarya will be on a boat travelling to the place where she has to get marry. Abhishek reaches there and shouts out for Aishwarya, and she responds by jumping into the river. They both reunite and share their moment of joy by telling how much they love each other. The movie ends on a happy note and they are married by the end.

Cast
Upendra as Abhishek Hegde
Deepika Padukone as Aishwarya Pai
Daisy Bopanna as Anjali
Komal Kumar as Bunk Seena
Kishan Shrikanth as Chintu 
Ramakrishna Neernalli
Sadhu Kokila
Sharan
Ramesh Bhat
Doddanna
Om Prakash Rao
Karthik Sharma

Box office
Aishwarya opened both in single screens and multiplexes as well. The film broke several opening box office records by generating a net share of 1.5 crore and a total gross of 20 million during its first week, out of which more than 10 million came from BKT (Bangalore, Kolar, Tumkur) alone, once again proving Upendra's strong foothold in the BKT region after his earlier record breaking opener Omkara which had also collected 10 million net from the BKT region in its first week. Aishwarya went on to complete 50 days of run at 30 centres across Karnataka and 75 days of run in Bangalore, and was a commercial success, although it could not reach expectations. Aishwarya grossed a total of 50 million in its entire run of 100 days and was among the top 5 hit films of 2006.

Soundtrack

The soundtrack was scored by Rajesh Ramanath.

Reception 
RG Vijayasarathy of Rediff.com gave the film a rating of three out of five stars and opined that "Krishnakumar's lighting, choice of locations, sharp editing and the peppy music make Aishwarya a very pleasing watch".

References

External links
 
Chitraloka
Review on NowRunning.com
www.Indiaglitz.com
Audio release of Aishwarya
Aishwarya goes Platinum

2006 films
2000s Kannada-language films
Films set in Bangalore
Kannada remakes of Telugu films
Films directed by Indrajit Lankesh
Films scored by Rajesh Ramnath
Indian romantic comedy films
Films scored by V. Ravichandran